Cougar is a class of fast patrol boat operated by the Navy of the Islamic Revolutionary Guard Corps of Iran.

History 
The vessel was first commissioned into the fleet in 2007, when at least ten of this class were unveiled.

Design 
According to Jane's Fighting Ships, Iranian Cougar-class vessels are similar to a craft operated by Hong Kong Maritime Police. The source cites the details of the class the same as Hong Kong vessel, while pointing that they may be different.

Speculated characteristics 

Armament 
Iranian Cougar vessels are equipped with two 12.7mm machine guns. They also use unknown radars.

References 

Fast patrol boat classes of the Navy of the Islamic Revolutionary Guard Corps
Ships built by Marine Industries Organization